The men's individual large hill/10 km Nordic combined competition for the 2014 Winter Olympics in Sochi, Russia, was held at RusSki Gorki Jumping Center on 18 February.

Results

Ski jumping
The ski jumping was held at 13:30.

Cross-country
The cross-country part was held at 16:00.

References

Nordic combined at the 2014 Winter Olympics